Renvall is a surname, borne by a Finnish family of scientists and artists. Notable members of the family include:

 Gustaf Renvall (1781–1841), linguist
 Torsten Thure Renvall (1884-1898), Archibischop of Turku
 Heikki Renvall, fennoman, husband of Aino Ackté

Finnish families